The Dome of Yusuf Agha is a small square building with a dome in the al-Aqsa Compound, in the courtyard between the Islamic Museum and al-Aqsa Mosque (al-Qibli).

History
It was built in 1681 and commemorates Yusuf Agha.

It was converted in the 1970s into a ticket office and an information kiosk for visitors.

Environs
It is in the middle of an open-air courtyard that stores detached column capitals.
To its south is the al-Aqsa Library.

To its west are the Islamic Museum and the Moors' Gate (Morocco Gate). 

To its southwest is the al-Fakhariyya Minaret.
To its north is a mihrab with a small window in it, the mihrab of the Pine Platform.

References

External links
 
  (41 seconds)
 Panorama of the courtyard with the dome in it. Another panorma, seen from farther north

Buildings and structures completed in 1681
Yusuf Agha, Dome of Yusuf Agha
Temple Mount
Buildings and structures in Jerusalem